Nationality words link to articles with information on the nation's poetry or literature (for instance, Irish or France).

Works
 William Cleland (k. 1689), A Collection of several Poems and Verses composed upon various occasions, Scottish
 John Wilmot, 2nd Earl of Rochester (d. 1680), Familiar Letters: Written by the Right Honourable John late Earl of Rochester. And several other Persons of Honour and Quality, English, 2 volumes, London: Printed by W. Onley for Sam Briscoe

Births
Death years link to the corresponding "[year] in poetry" article:
April 24 – Kamo no Mabuchi 賀茂真淵 (died 1769), Japanese Edo period poet and philologist
October 16 – Nicholas Amhurst (died 1742), English poet and political writer
Mehetabel ("Hetty") Wesley (died 1750), English poet

Deaths
Birth years link to the corresponding "[year] in poetry" article:
October 1 – Moses ben Mordecai Zacuto (born 1625), kabalistic writer and poet
December 9 – Scipion Abeille (year of birth unknown), French surgeon and poet
 Juan del Valle y Caviedes (born 1645), Spanish Peruvian poet and author
 Ebba Maria De la Gardie (born 1657), Swedish poet
 Mei Qing (born c.1623), Chinese landscape painter, calligrapher and poet

See also

 List of years in poetry
 List of years in literature
 17th century in poetry
 17th century in literature
 Poetry

External links
 "A Time-Line of Poetry in English" Representative Poetry Online website

Notes

17th-century poetry
Poetry